Aer Lingus (U.K.) Limited is a British airline and a sister company of the Irish Aer Lingus. It is headquartered in Belfast, Northern Ireland with its operations based at Manchester Airport. The airline's operations launched on 20 October 2021, with its inaugural flight from Manchester to Bridgetown.

History 
Aer Lingus UK Limited was founded on 25 May 2012 with its headquarters in Belfast, Northern Ireland as a United Kingdom-based airline. The company then remained dormant until 2020. In November 2020, plans for the airline involved launching the operation of transatlantic flights from the UK to the United States with the initial planned destinations being Boston Logan, New York-JFK, and Orlando International Airport from it’s hub at Manchester Airport followed by flights during the winter season to Bridgetown. The airline's initial fleet plans consisted of two Airbus A321LRs and two Airbus A330-300s, all to be transferred from parent company Aer Lingus. The airline would conceptually compete with Virgin Atlantic, another British airline operating transatlantic flights from Manchester, as well as fill in part of the void left by Manchester-based and headquartered Thomas Cook Airlines, which ceased operations in September 2019.

In December 2020, the airline applied with the United States Department of Transportation (USDOT) for a foreign air carrier permit, which was approved in March 2021. Parent company Aer Lingus subsequently announced on 24 March 2021 that flights from Manchester Airport operated by Aer Lingus UK would launch to New York-JFK and Orlando International Airport on 29 July 2021, to Bridgetown on 20 October 2021, and to Boston Logan during summer 2022. In June 2021, the airline announced that the commencement of services to the United States would be postponed until 30 September 2021. This was due to international borders between the UK and the United States reopening later than expected.

On 8 July 2021, Aer Lingus UK was granted its air operator's certificate (AOC) by the UK CAA. The airline also submitted its AOC to the USDOT for the approval of its application. In the days prior to receiving its AOC, the airline officially transferred one Airbus A330-300 from parent company Aer Lingus, with the transfer of one Airbus A321LR and a further Airbus A330-300 following. On 25 August 2021, the airline's services to the United States were again postponed to December 2021 as a result of the continued delay of UK-US border restrictions being lifted. Bridgetown services were unaffected resulting in operations commencing with three weekly flights to Bridgetown on 20 October 2021. 

Operations between Manchester and the United States commenced on 1 December 2021 with the introduction of a year round daily service to New York-JFK. This was followed by the introduction of four weekly flights to Orlando International Airport on 11 December 2021. Frequency of services between Manchester and Orlando increases to daily during the Summer season in the absence of services to Bridgetown (May-October inclusive). 

The decision was later made to not commence operations between Manchester and Boston Logan in the summer of 2022. This was due to aircraft availability as a decision was made to resume operations between Boston Logan and New York-JFK from Shannon Airport after initially closing the base. This meant only one of the planned two Airbus A321-253LR aircraft could be provided to the UK fleet.

In October 2022, it was announced that Aer Lingus operations between Belfast City and London Heathrow would transfer to Aer Lingus UK due to Brexit related requirements that a European carrier could no longer fly domestic routes within the United Kingdom. These flights are operated by British Airways under Wet-Lease terms using the Aer Lingus UK flight numbers and callsigns. This currently does not affect the operations carried out by Emerald Airlines from Belfast City as an agreement is currently in place between the UK CAA, British Airways and themselves prior to Emerald Airlines securing a UK AOC.

Destinations 
Aer Lingus UK operates to the following destinations :

Fleet 
, Aer Lingus UK operates the following aircraft:

The additional A330-300 is scheduled to resume operations from 11 April 2023 replacing the A321LR. This coincides with the return of the A321LR to Aer Lingus.

References

Aer Lingus
Airlines of the United Kingdom
Airlines established in 2020
British companies established in 2020
British subsidiaries of foreign companies
2020 establishments in Northern Ireland
Companies based in Belfast